GURPS Monsters is a 128-page soft-bound book compiled by J. Hunter Johnson and published in 2002 by Steve Jackson Games as a supplement for the GURPS role-playing game system. It contains biographies and gaming statistics for forty-eight monsters for various campaign settings.

Contents

A Mythological Menagerie
 Amenhotep the Mummy, an undead pharaoh
 Asterius the Minotaur, half-man, half-bull
 Curupira, a Tupi protector of the forest
 The Golem, the Jewish legend of a clay man
 The Great Leech of Tlanusi'yi, a 350-foot worm
 Lilith, Adam's first wife
 La Llorona, the Weeping Woman of the Rio Grande
 Medusa, a woman with a petrifying gaze
 Scylla, a six-headed dog-woman
 Tiamat, the Sumerian dragon-goddess
 Yama Uba, a Japanese witch

The Cryptozoo
 The Beast of Le Gévaudan, a giant wolf
 Bigfoot, a shy simian biped
 El Chupacabra, the Puerto Rican goat-sucker
 The Great Sphinx, the guardian of Egypt
 The Honey Island Swamp Monster, the Louisiana Wookiee
 Hughes De Camp-D'Avesnes, French 11th-century nobleman and werewolf
 The Jersey Devil, a hoofed, winged near-man
 The Mothman, the prophetic insectoid creature
 Specimen Alpha-39, an intelligent sewer alligator
 Spring-Heeled Jack, a red-eyed, leaping trickster

Legends of Literature
 The Big Bad Wolf, a cautionary tale about carnality
 The Doppelgänger, an identity-stealing manipulator
 Dracula, the world's most celebrated vampire
 Frankenstein's Monster, Mary Shelley's famous creation
 Geryon, a demon from Dante's Inferno
 Grendel, arch-enemy of Beowulf
 Headless Horseman, the pumpkin-headed Hessian mercenary
 The Phantom of the Opera, a deformed but cultured man
 The Queen of Air and Darkness, a cold-hearted faerie 
 Shub-Internet, a Lovecraftian transdimensional entity suffusing the internet

Original Monsters
 Barclay Thormon, the disembodied brain of a cruel businessman
 Benny the Fox, a sadistic cartoon come to life
 Elrond Carver, a radioactive gangster for GURPS Technomancer
 Gill Man, an homage to the Creature from the Black Lagoon
 Hachi-Otoko, a man-shaped swarm of bees
 Harvester, a gigantic, hungry mass of writhing tentacles
 Ixis, a shapeshifting imposter for a fantasy campaign
 Leatherjacket, a dismembered killer held together by his harness
 Leviathan, a conglomeration of many human victims
 Lord K'Han the Giant Ape, inspired by King Kong
 The Maylum Spirit, a vicious ghost trapped in an insane asylum
 Pusan Chen, an undead dragon
 Special Agent Thomas Johnson, a Man in Black like Agent Smith
 Stitches the Patchwork Clown, a murderous doll
 Sylvia Sternenkind, a beautiful bioroid serial-killer for GURPS Transhuman Space
 Tamok the Conqueror, a telepathic leader of an alien space fleet
 The Woodbury Blob, inspired by The Blob

Publication history
GURPS Monsters is a 128-page soft-bound book compiled by J. Hunter Johnson and published in 2002 by Steve Jackson Games as a supplement for the GURPS role-playing game system.

Writer/compiler
Hunter Johnson is a freelance game designer, author, and translator. He has translated many game rules and websites from German for Mayfair Games. He authored or co-authored six books for Steve Jackson Games, including GURPS Monsters, GURPS WWII: Frozen Hell, and the second edition of GURPS Japan. Johnson served for five years as the first coordinator of GURPS errata for Steve Jackson Games. He has also designed a few computer games, including gToons for Cartoon Network. (published by White Wolf Publishing) and Quizgle.com.

Reception
GURPS Monsters won a rating of A in a review published in Games Unplugged. John G. Snyder of gamingreport.com rated the book at 4 1/2 stars, saying, "You will be pleasantly surprised and not a little disturbed." Freelance writer Craig Oxbrow says in a 2001 review of the book for rpg.net, "GURPS Monsters is a wealth of ideas and inspiration for monsters as characters," and that it "will see use beyond the GURPS system."

See also
 List of GURPS books

References

External links
RPGNet review
Short bio and credentials of one of the contributing authors

Monsters
Role-playing game supplements introduced in 2002